Michael Aw is a Singaporean marine photographer and author based in Sydney, Australia.

Aw's professional career is in advertising and marketing working mainly in mainstream advertising agencies based in Australia, the US, and Singapore. He quit in 1991 to shoot professionally focusing mainly on marine life. Aw is a fellow of the Explorer Club NY and he also a Fellow of the International League of Conservation Photographers.

In 2006, Aw won the underwater category of Wildlife Photographer of the Year. He also won the Gold diver awards for the slide show and portfolios categories at the World Festival of Underwater Pictures 2010 held at France.

See also
 Nature photography
 Conservation photography

References

Living people
Singaporean people of Chinese descent
Fellows of the Explorers Club
Year of birth missing (living people)